Colégio Certo is a school located in Teresina, the capital of Piauí state, in the north-east of Brazil.  The school opened in 1996.

References

External links

  (in Portuguese)

Schools in Brazil